Bois-Colombes is a commune in the northwestern suburbs of Paris, France. In 2017, it had a population of 28,239. International companies such as Colgate-Palmolive, IBM and Aviva have their French headquarters in Bois-Colombes.

History
The commune of Bois-Colombes (literally "Dove Woods") was created on 13 March 1896 by detaching its territory from the commune of Colombes.

Population

Transport
Bois-Colombes is served by two stations on the Transilien Paris – Saint-Lazare suburban rail line: Bois-Colombes and Les Vallées.

Education
The commune has:
 Six combined preschools and primary schools: Françoise-Dolto, Gramme, La Cigogne, Pierre-Joigneaux, Jules-Ferry, Paul-Bert
 One elementary-only school: Saint-Exupéry
 Two junior high schools: Collège Jean-Mermoz and Collège Albert-Camus
 Two senior high schools: Lycée Albert-Camus and Lycée professionnel régional

Personalities 
 Henry Charles Litolff, pianist composer and music publisher (5 February 1818 – 5 or 6 August 1891)
 Michel Descombey, ballet dancer and choreographer, born 1930
 René Maillard, composer (8 April 1931 – 4 December 2012)
 Patrick Noubissie, footballer
 Catherine Millet, author and critic
 Henri Betti, composer and pianist married in Bois-Colombes in 1949.
 Bob Sinclar, record producer and DJ

International relations
Bois-Colombes is twinned with:
 Neu-Ulm, Germany

See also

Communes of the Hauts-de-Seine department
 The statue "jeune fille à la sandale" in Bois-Colombes's square de l'Hôtel de Ville is by the sculptor Pierre Charles Lenoir

References

External links

 Bois-Colombes website (in French)

Communes of Hauts-de-Seine
Hauts-de-Seine communes articles needing translation from French Wikipedia